A draft horse (US), draught horse (UK) or dray horse (from the Old English dragan meaning "to draw or haul"; compare Dutch dragen and German tragen meaning "to carry" and Danish drage meaning "to draw" or "to fare"), less often called a carthorse, work horse or heavy horse, is a large horse bred to be a working animal doing hard tasks such as plowing and other farm labor. There are a number of breeds, with varying characteristics, but all share common traits of strength, patience, and a docile temperament which made them indispensable to generations of pre-industrial farmers.

Draft horses and draft crossbreds are versatile breeds used today for a multitude of purposes, including farming, draft horse showing, logging, recreation, and other uses. They are also commonly used for crossbreeding, especially to light riding breeds such as the Thoroughbred, for the purpose of creating sport horses of warmblood type.  While most draft horses are used for driving, they can be ridden and some of the lighter draft breeds are capable performers under saddle.

Characteristics

Draft horses are recognizable by their tall stature and extremely muscular build. In general, they tend to have a more upright shoulder, producing more upright movement and conformation that is well suited for pulling. They tend to have broad, short backs with powerful hindquarters, again best suited for the purpose of pulling. Additionally, the draft breeds usually have heavy bone, and a good deal of feathering on their lower legs. Many have a straight profile or "Roman nose" (a convex profile).

Draft horses crossbred on light riding horses adds height and weight to the ensuing offspring, and may increase the power and "scope" of the animal's movement.

The largest horse in recorded history was probably a Shire named Sampson (later Mammoth), who was born in 1846.

History

Humans domesticated horses and used them to perform a variety of duties.  One type of horse-powered work was the hauling of heavy loads, plowing fields, and other tasks that required pulling ability. A heavy, calm, patient and well-muscled animal was desired for this work.  Conversely, a light, more energetic horse was needed for riding and rapid transport.  Thus, to the extent possible, a certain amount of selective breeding was used to develop different types of horse for different types of work.

It is a common misunderstanding that the Destrier that carried the armoured knight of the Middle Ages had the size and conformation of a modern draft horse, and some of these Medieval war horses may have provided some bloodlines for some of the modern draft breeds. The reality was that the high-spirited, quick-moving Destrier was closer to the size, build, and temperament of a modern Andalusian or Friesian. There also were working farm horses of more phlegmatic temperaments used for pulling military wagons or performing ordinary farm work which provided bloodlines of the modern draft horse.  Records indicate that even medieval drafts were not as large as those today. Of the modern draft breeds, the Percheron probably has the closest ties to the medieval war horse.

By the 19th century horses weighing more than  that also moved at a quick pace were in demand. Tall stature, muscular backs, and powerful hindquarters made the draft horse a source of "Horsepower" for farming, hauling freight and moving passengers. The railroads increased demand for working horses, as a growing economy still needed transport over the 'last mile' between the goods yard or station and the final customer. Even in the 20th century, draft horses were used for practical work, including over half a million used during World War I to support the military effort, until motor vehicles became an affordable and reliable substitute.

In the late 19th century and early 20th century, thousands of draft horses were imported from Western Europe into the United States.  Percherons came from France, Belgians from Belgium, Shires from England, Clydesdales from Scotland. Many American draft registries were founded in the late 19th century.  The Percheron, with 40,000 broodmares registered as of 1915, was America's most numerous draft breed at the turn of the 20th century.  A breed developed exclusively in the U.S. was the American Cream Draft, which  had a stud book established by the 1930s.

Beginning in the late 19th century, and with increasing mechanization in the 20th century, especially following World War I in the US and after World War II in Europe, the popularity of the internal combustion engine, and particularly the tractor, reduced the need for the draft horse.  Many were sold to slaughter for horsemeat and a number of breeds went into significant decline.

Today draft horses are most often seen at shows, pulling competition and entered in competitions called "heavy horse" trials, or as exhibition animals pulling large wagons.  However, they are still seen on some smaller farms in the US and Europe.  They are particularly popular with groups such as Amish and Mennonite farmers, as well as those individuals who wish to farm with a renewable source of power. They are also sometimes used during horse logging, a forestry management practice to remove logs from dense woodland where there is insufficient space for mechanized vehicles or for other conservation considerations. Crossbred draft horses also played a significant role in the development of a number of warmblood breeds, popular today in international FEI competition up to the Olympic Equestrian level.

Small areas still exist where draft horses are widely used as transportation due to legislation preventing automotive traffic, such as on Mackinac Island in the United States.

Care

Feeding, caring for and shoeing a one-ton draft horse is costly. Although many draft horses can work without a need for shoes, if they are required, farriers may charge twice the price to shoe a draft horse as a light riding horse because of the extra labor and specialized equipment required.  Historically, draft horses were shod with horseshoes that were significantly wider and heavier than those for other types of horses, custom-made, often with caulkins.

The draft horse's metabolism is a bit slower than riding horse breeds, more akin to that of ponies, requiring less feed per pound of body weight. This is possibly due to their calmer nature. Nonetheless, because of their sheer size, most require a significant amount of fodder per day. Generally a supplement to balance nutrients is preferred over a large quantity of grain. They consume hay or other forage from 1.5% to 3% of their body weight per day, depending on work level. Overfeeding can lead to obesity, and risk of laminitis can be a concern.

World record

Breeds

A number of horse breeds are used as draft horses, with the popularity of a given breed often closely linked to geographic location. In North America there were five draft horse breeds on the classic list: Belgian, Clydesdale, Percheron, Shire, and Suffolk.

The Draft Cross Breeders and Owners Association recognizes the following breeds as draft horses: 

Other breeds may be classified as draft horses by various organizations.

Harness horses

The terms harness horse and light harness horse refer to horses of a lighter build, such as traditional carriage horses and show horses, and are not terms generally used to denote "heavy" or draft horses. Harness horse breeds include heavy warmblood breeds such as the Oldenburg and Cleveland Bay, as well as lighter breeds such as the Hackney, and in some disciplines, such as combined driving, light riding breeds such as the Thoroughbred or Morgan may be seen.

References

External links

 Draft Cross Breeders and Owners Association
 Heavyhorses.org.uk

Types of horse
Animal-powered transport